Apis mellifera simensis is known by the common name of the Ethiopian honey bee, discovered in 2011 through DNA analysis, which directly contradicted previous researchers which had misidentified the honey bees of Ethiopia, attributing them to neighboring subspecies in eastern Africa, in part due to similar Morphometrics. A. m. simensis was found to deviate substantially from other Apis mellifera when genetically analysed, in that a new Y Lineage branch of the Apis mellifera was created for them: There had previously thought to be up to five different subspecies within Ethiopia.

They are larger than most honey bees of Africa, only slightly smaller than the Egyptian Apis mellifera lamarckii to the north, and slightly larger than the Apis mellifera monticola to the south, however having much longer and broader wings typical of larger honey bees. They are usually very dark like the A. m. monticola, occasionally with some pigmentation, and also like the A. m. monticola they have relatively longer hair.

Their distribution is typically in the mountain ranges of Ethiopia, covering the northern and central areas of the country, only the A. m. simensis was detected throughout Ethiopia, samples were collected from the greater part of the country.

Etymology
The name simensis is taken from the Simien Mountains, a dominant mountain range in northern Ethiopia and a World Heritage Site. A previously attempted naming by Mogga in 1988 of Apis mellifera bandasii and Apis mellifera woyi-gambella by Amssalu in 2004 were both determined to be nomina nuda according to the I.C.Z.N. rules. In 2022 research was conducted within Ethiopia on A. m. simensis mistakenly referred to as Apis mellifera bandasii.

References 

mellifera simensis
Western honey bee breeds